Live at Maybeck Recital Hall, Volume Five is an album of solo performances by jazz pianist Stanley Cowell, recorded in 1990.

Music and recording
The album was recorded in June 1990 at the Maybeck Recital Hall in Berkeley, California. Most of the material is standards and common bebop pieces, with some Cowell compositions added. The originals include "Cal Massey", a tribute to the trumpeter. Cowell plays in all twelve keys during "Softly, as in a Morning Sunrise".

Release and reception

Live at Maybeck Recital Hall, Volume Five was released by Concord Records. The AllMusic reviewer described it as "A very interesting recital." The Penguin Guide to Jazz concluded that it is "An excellent set by a master at the height of his considerable powers."

Track listing
"Softly, as in a Morning Sunrise"
"Stompin' at the Savoy"
"I Am Waiting"
"Nefertiti"
"Jitterbug Waltz"
"Stella by Starlight"
"I'll Remember April"
"Lament"
"Out Of This World"
"Django"
"Big Foot"
"Little Sunny"
"Autumn Leaves"
"Cal Massey"

Personnel
Stanley Cowell – piano

References

1990 live albums
Albums recorded at the Maybeck Recital Hall
Concord Records live albums
Solo piano jazz albums